Jack Robert Garratt (born 11 October 1991) is an English singer, songwriter and composer from Little Chalfont, Buckinghamshire. He released his debut studio album Phase on 19 February 2016. At the 2016 Brit Awards he received the Critics' Choice Award.

Early life 
Jack Robert Garratt was born 11 October 1991 in High Wycombe in Buckinghamshire. His mother was a primary school music teacher and his father was a police officer. He grew up in the village of Little Chalfont. About his childhood he has stated that: "I just really enjoyed making noises and really enjoyed the reaction that I got from making those noises. So they [parents] put me on music lessons to encourage me to hone in on that talent rather than show off." He wrote his first song when he was 12 and learned to play a variety of instruments from the guitar, drums and piano to the harmonica, mandolin, trombone and ukulele. He attended St Clement Danes School in Chorleywood and the University of Roehampton in London.

Career

Junior Eurovision 2005 
In September 2005, Jack entered the UK national selection for that year's Junior Eurovision Song Contest to be held in Belgium. On the night Jack's song "The Girl" finished 8/8 with just 13 points. He has since said "That was the first time I tried to achieve anything as a musician but my intentions were wrong. I did it more for attention rather than for a love of what I was doing."

2009–2013 
Jack Garratt went to university to train to be a teacher. He signed to an independent record label and began working on an album with the title Nickel and Dime. The music was acoustic blues music. He was played on BBC Three Counties Radio in March 2012 as part of BBC Introducing.

He abandoned the album when he realised that "I wasn't proud of the songs I was writing, and I was performing the music because I liked the way that people reacted rather than because I was proud of the songs." He dropped out of university and "had a real self-destructive moment" and has said that "I felt like I was going through a quarter or a midlife crisis, but I was not even 20." He decided to write music "with a totally different level of respect and integrity" and spent a year writing new songs.

2014–2016: Phase 
On 28 October 2014, Jack released his first extended play, Remnants, and a remix EP, Remnix. On 28 November 2014 he released the single "The Love You're Given". His 2014 single "Worry" was playlisted by BBC Radio 1, and he headlined the BBC Introducing stage of the Reading and Leeds Festivals.
He also headlined at the Lost Village Festival in Lincoln in 2016. On 27 September 2015 he performed at the Apple Music Festival which took place at The Roundhouse, London. Garratt supported Mumford and Sons on their 2015 UK tour, playing at 13 events at 9 arenas across the UK and Ireland. He was the winner of the Critics' Choice category at the 2016 Brit Awards, BBC Sound of 2016 poll and is on MTV's Brand New 2016 shortlist. He released his debut studio album Phase on 19 February 2016.
In February 2016 he played his single "Worry" during the Italian show "Che tempo che fa".

2017–present: Hiatus and Love, Death and Dancing 
After finishing touring Phase at the end of 2016, over the next year Jack recorded a new album, which he ultimately scrapped, saying that "It was trash. It was awful. It was all bad. I wasn't willing to accept myself in that moment, so I wasn't willing to have a good idea." He then took time off to deal with the anxiety and self-doubt that he was feeling as a result of the attention and scrutiny that had come with the success and awards for his previous album. He then met with record producer Jacknife Lee, and together they began working on recording new music. On 6 February 2020, his new single "Time" premiered as the "Hottest Record" on Annie Mac's Future Sounds show on BBC Radio 1. The song features as the opening track on his new EP Love, Death and Dancing (Vol. 1) which was released on the same day. This EP makes up part of Garratt's second album Love, Death and Dancing, which was released on 12 June 2020.

Discography

Studio albums

Extended plays

Singles

Songwriting and production credits

Awards and nominations

References

External links 
 

1991 births
21st-century English singers
Brit Award winners
English electronic musicians
English male singers
Island Records artists
Living people
Musicians from Buckinghamshire
People from Chiltern District
British indie pop musicians
British trip hop musicians
21st-century British male singers